Gert Bonnier (1890 – 1961) was a Swedish geneticist and Drosophila researcher. He was a professor in the zoology department at Stockholm College.

Family life
A member of the Bonnier family, Bonnier was the third of four sons of Karl Otto Bonnier, a publisher who served as leader of the Albert Bonniers förlag publishing house. Unlike his three brothers, Gert did not work at his father's publishing house.

References

Swedish geneticists
1890 births
1961 deaths
Academic staff of Stockholm University
Bonnier family